Desert and Wilderness is a 1973 Polish film directed by Władysław Ślesicki. Adapted from the 1911 novel In Desert and Wilderness by Henryk Sienkiewicz, it tells the story of two kids, Staś Tarkowski and Nel Rawlison, kidnapped by the rebels during Mahdi's rebellion in Sudan.

The film is 193 minutes long and is composed of 2 parts which were shown separately in theaters. Work on it started in 1971. It was filmed in Egypt, Sudan and Bulgaria, with an international cast and crew. At the same time, a four-part miniseries was made. It is similar to the film but has some additional scenes as well as some altered scenes. Another adaptation was released in 2001.

Cast 

 Monika Rosca .... Nel Rawlison
 Tomasz Mędrzak .... Staś Tarkowski
 Emos Bango .... Kali
 Malia Mekki .... Mea
 Edmund Fetting .... George Rawlison (Nel's father)
 Stanisław Jasiukiewicz .... Władysław Tarkowski (Staś's father)
 Zygmunt Hobot .... Kaliopuli
 Zygmunt Maciejewski .... Linde
 Ahmed Hegazi .... Gebhr
 Ahmed Marei .... Chamis
 Ibrahim Shemi .... Idrys
 Abdel Menam Abu El Fatouh .... Mahdi
 Hosna Suleyman .... Dinah
 Stefania Mędrzak .... Madame Olivier
 Fatma Helal .... Fatma
 Jerzy Kamas .... Tarkowski's voice (uncredited)
 Abbas Fares, Mohamed Hamdi, Bogumił Simeonow, Gawrił Gawriłow and others.

References

External links 

1973 films
1970s Polish-language films
Films based on Polish novels
Films based on works by Henryk Sienkiewicz
Films shot in Bulgaria
Films set in the 1880s
Films set in deserts
Films set in Sudan